Ryan Gaucher (born February 23, 1978) is a Canadian former professional ice hockey defenceman.

Gaucher spent the majority of his career playing in the ECHL and in Europe. He was twice named into the ECHL First All-Star Team, in 2003 while with the Cincinnati Cyclones and in 2006 with the Alaska Aces where he also won the Kelly Cup. He moved to Europe in 2006, playing in the Austrian Hockey League for EHC Linz, the Metal Ligaen for SønderjyskE and the Deutsche Eishockey Liga for the Kassel Huskies.

Awards and honours

References

External links
 

1978 births
Alaska Aces (ECHL) players
Arizona Sundogs players
Canadian ice hockey defencemen
Cincinnati Cyclones (ECHL) players
Cincinnati Mighty Ducks players
Cleveland Barons (2001–2006) players
EHC Black Wings Linz players
Florence Pride players
HC Gardena players
Ice hockey people from Saskatchewan
Kassel Huskies players
Las Vegas Wranglers players
Living people
Louisiana IceGators (ECHL) players
Mississippi Sea Wolves players
Norfolk Admirals players
Providence Bruins players
Saskatoon Blades players
Schwenninger Wild Wings players
SønderjyskE Ishockey players
Sportspeople from Saskatoon
Starbulls Rosenheim players
Toledo Storm players
Canadian expatriate ice hockey players in Austria
Canadian expatriate ice hockey players in Denmark
Canadian expatriate ice hockey players in Germany